Hyachinthe-Marie de Brouchoven (1650-1707), Lord of Steen and Spy, was a Flemish nobleman who became president of the Great Council of Mechelen.

Family 
He was born the son of Jean-Baptiste de Brouchoven, Count of Bergeyck, and his wife Hélène Fourment. His elder brother, Jean de Brouchoven, became the second count of Bergeyck. Hyacinthe Marie inherited the Lordship of Spy. He married Marie-Adrienne Zuallart, by whom he had two children. The branch of Brouchoven-Spy became extinct when his son died without heirs.

Hyachinthe-Marie de Brouchoven, Lord of Spymarried to Marie-Adrienne de Zuallart
Guillaume-François de Brouchoven, Lord of Spy: no heirs.
 Marie-Jeanne de Brouchoven-Spy, died 1708;married to Charles-Antoine de Zevecote, Lord of Soetschore.
Marie-Caroline de Zevecote, Lady of Soetschore, born in 1701 x Pierre-Albert Colins, Lord of Ter-Meeren.

Career 
He was foreseen to become member of the diocesan prelature, and became in 1673 member of the Chapter of Ghent Catedral.
In 1678 he was elected to become member of the Council of Namur and resigned his function in Ghent. Two years later he became member of the Great Council of Mechelen, and in 1690 a councillor on the Supreme Council of Flanders in Madrid. He was a diplomat in the service of the Spanish crown and proven to be a loyal advisor. He participated in Lille to the treaty of Ryswyck, where he was elected to become 19th president of the great council by royal command of 7 May 1699.

He died in 1707.

Notes

Presidents of the Great Council
Brouchoven family
1650 births
1707 deaths